The 2014 Wimbledon Championships was a tennis tournament played on grass courts at the All England Lawn Tennis and Croquet Club in Wimbledon, London in the United Kingdom. It was the 128th edition of the Wimbledon Championships and were held from 23 June to 6 July 2014. It was the third Grand Slam tennis event of the year and was part of the ATP World Tour, the WTA Tour, the ITF Junior Tour and the NEC Tour. The championships were organised by the All England Lawn Tennis and Croquet Club and the International Tennis Federation.

Andy Murray was the defending champion in the men's singles, but lost to Grigor Dimitrov in the quarterfinals. Marion Bartoli was the reigning champion in the women's singles; however, her retirement from the sport following her victory meant that she did not return to defend her title. As a result, the opening Ladies' Singles match on Centre Court on the second day of the tournament – which is traditionally played by the defending champion – was played by Bartoli's opponent in the 2013 final, runner-up Sabine Lisicki.

The men and women's singles titles were won by Novak Djokovic and Petra Kvitová respectively.

Tournament

The 2014 Wimbledon Championships was the 128th edition of the tournament and was held at All England Lawn Tennis and Croquet Club in London.

The tournament was an event run by the International Tennis Federation (ITF) and was part of the 2014 ATP World Tour and the 2014 WTA Tour calendars under the Grand Slam category. The tournament consisted of both men's and women's singles and doubles draws as well as a mixed doubles event.
There were singles and doubles events for both boys and girls (players under 18), which was part of the Grade A category of tournaments, and doubles events for men's and women's wheelchair tennis players as part of the NEC tour under the Grand Slam category. The tournament was played on grass courts and takes place over a series of 19 courts, including the four main showcourts, Centre Court, No. 1 Court, No. 2 Court and No. 3 Court.

Point and prize money distribution

Point distribution
Below is a series of tables for each of the competitions showing the ranking points on offer for each event.

Seniors points

Wheelchair points

Junior points

Prize money
The Wimbledon total prize money for 2014 has been increased by 10.8% to £25,000,000. The winners of the men's and women's singles titles will earn £1.76m, up £160,000 from the previous year. The figures for doubles events are per pair.

* per team

Singles players
2014 Wimbledon Championships – Men's singles

2014 Wimbledon Championships – Women's singles

Day-by-day summaries

Champions

Seniors

Men's singles

 Novak Djokovic def.  Roger Federer, 6–7(7–9), 6–4, 7–6(7–4), 5–7, 6–4

Women's singles

 Petra Kvitová def.  Eugenie Bouchard, 6–3, 6–0

Men's doubles

 Vasek Pospisil /  Jack Sock def.  Bob Bryan /  Mike Bryan, 7–6(7–5), 6–7(3–7), 6–4, 3–6, 7–5

Women's doubles

 Sara Errani /  Roberta Vinci def.  Tímea Babos /  Kristina Mladenovic, 6–1, 6–3

Mixed doubles

 Nenad Zimonjić /  Samantha Stosur def.  Max Mirnyi /  Chan Hao-ching, 6–4, 6–2

Juniors

Boys' singles

 Noah Rubin def.  Stefan Kozlov, 6–4, 4–6, 6–3

Girls' singles

 Jeļena Ostapenko def.  Kristína Schmiedlová, 2–6, 6–3, 6–0

Boys' doubles

 Orlando Luz /  Marcelo Zormann def.  Stefan Kozlov /  Andrey Rublev, 6–4, 3–6, 8–6

Girls' doubles

 Tami Grende /  Ye Qiuyu def.  Marie Bouzková /  Dalma Gálfi, 6–2, 7–6(7–5)

Invitation

Gentlemen's invitation doubles

 Thomas Enqvist /  Mark Philippoussis def.  Jacco Eltingh /  Paul Haarhuis, 3–6, 6–3, [10–3]

Ladies' invitation doubles

 Jana Novotná /  Barbara Schett def.  Martina Navratilova /  Selima Sfar, 6–0, 7–6(7–2)

Senior gentlemen's invitation doubles

 Guy Forget /  Cédric Pioline def.  Rick Leach /  Mark Woodforde, 6–4, 6–3

Wheelchair

Wheelchair men's doubles

 Stéphane Houdet /  Shingo Kunieda def.  Maikel Scheffers /  Ronald Vink, 5–7, 6–0, 6–3

Wheelchair women's doubles

 Yui Kamiji /  Jordanne Whiley def.  Jiske Griffioen /  Aniek van Koot, 2–6, 6–2, 7–5

Singles seeds

Gentlemen's singles
The Gentlemen's singles seeds are adjusted on a surface-based system to reflect more accurately the individual player's grass court achievement as per the following formula, which applies to the top 32 players, according to ATP ranking on 16 June 2014:	
 Take Entry System Position (ESP) points at 16 June 2014
 Add 100% points earned for all grass court tournaments in the past 12 months (16.06.2013 – 15.06.2014).
 Add 75% points earned for best grass court tournament in the 12 months before that (12.06.2012 – 15.06.2013)
Rankings are as of 16 June 2014 and Points Before in the following table are as of 23 June 2014.

†The player did not qualify for the tournament in 2013. Accordingly, this was the 18th best result deducted instead.

Withdrawn players

Women's singles
For the Women's singles seeds, the seeding order follows the ranking list, except where in the opinion of the committee, the grass court credentials of a particular player necessitates a change in the interest of achieving a balanced draw.

Doubles seeds

Men's doubles

1 Rankings are as of 16 June 2014.

Women's doubles

1 Rankings are as of 16 June 2014.
2 Based on singles rankings.

Mixed doubles

1 Rankings are as of 23 June 2014.

Main draw wild card entries
The following players received wild cards into the main draw senior events.

Men's singles
  Marcos Baghdatis
  Daniel Cox
  Kyle Edmund
  Dan Evans
  Nick Kyrgios
  Daniel Smethurst
  Jiří Veselý
  James Ward

Women's singles
  Naomi Broady
  Jarmila Gajdošová
  Tara Moore
  Samantha Murray
  Kristýna Plíšková
  Sílvia Soler Espinosa
  Taylor Townsend
  Vera Zvonareva

Men's doubles
 Edward Corrie /  Daniel Smethurst
 Jamie Delgado /  Gilles Müller
 Kyle Edmund /  Sergiy Stakhovsky
 Dan Evans /  James Ward
 Colin Fleming /  Ross Hutchins

Women's doubles
 Naomi Broady /  Eleni Daniilidou
 Martina Hingis /  Vera Zvonareva
 Johanna Konta /  Tara Moore
 Jocelyn Rae /  Anna Smith

Mixed doubles
  Colin Fleming /  Jocelyn Rae
  Ross Hutchins /  Heather Watson
  Neal Skupski /  Naomi Broady
  James Ward /  Anna Smith

Qualifiers entries
Below are the lists of the qualifiers entering in the main draws.

Men's singles

Men's singles qualifiers
  Luke Saville 
  James Duckworth
  Alex Kuznetsov
  Gilles Müller
  Ante Pavić
  Konstantin Kravchuk
  Marsel İlhan
  Yūichi Sugita
  Denis Kudla
  Jimmy Wang 
  Pierre-Hugues Herbert
  Tim Pütz
  Sam Groth
  Tatsuma Ito 
  Jan Hernych
  Ryan Harrison

Lucky losers
  Malek Jaziri
  Frank Dancevic
  Simone Bolelli
  Aljaž Bedene

Women's singles

Women's singles qualifiers
  Alla Kudryavtseva
  Tereza Smitková
  Timea Bacsinszky
  Michelle Larcher de Brito
  Aleksandra Wozniak
  Lesia Tsurenko
  Paula Kania
  Ana Konjuh
  Victoria Duval
  Tamira Paszek
  Anett Kontaveit 
  Andreea Mitu

Men's doubles

Men's doubles qualifiers
  Marcelo Demoliner /  Purav Raja
  Andreas Siljeström /  Igor Zelenay
  Ryan Harrison /  Kevin King
  Alex Bolt /  Andrew Whittington

Women's doubles

Women's doubles qualifiers
  Lyudmyla Kichenok /  Nadiia Kichenok
  Jarmila Gajdošová /  Arina Rodionova
  Pauline Parmentier /  Laura Thorpe
  Vesna Dolonc /  Daniela Seguel

Lucky losers
  Yuliya Beygelzimer /  Klaudia Jans-Ignacik

Protected ranking
The following players were accepted directly into the main draw using a protected ranking:

Men's Singles
  Pablo Cuevas (PR 54)
  Jürgen Zopp (PR 88)

Withdrawals
The following players were accepted directly into the main tournament, but withdrew with injuries or personal reasons.

Men's Singles
 Nicolás Almagro → replaced by  Aljaž Bedene
 Nikolay Davydenko → replaced by  Adrian Mannarino
 Juan Martín del Potro → replaced by  Andreas Haider-Maurer
 Ivan Dodig → replaced by  Simone Bolelli
 Tommy Haas → replaced by  Frank Dancevic
 Florian Mayer → replaced by  Michał Przysiężny
 Juan Mónaco → replaced by  Andrey Kuznetsov
 Albert Montañés → replaced by  Malek Jaziri
 Janko Tipsarević → replaced by  David Goffin

Women's Singles
  Jamie Hampton → replaced by  Heather Watson
  Bethanie Mattek-Sands → replaced by  Tímea Babos
  Laura Robson → replaced by  Andrea Hlaváčková
  Galina Voskoboeva → replaced by  Hsieh Su-wei

See also

The Air Navigation (Restriction of Flying) (Wimbledon) Regulations 2014

References

External links

 Official Wimbledon Championships website

 
Wimbledon Championships
Wimbledon Championships
Wimbledon Championships
Wimbledon Championships